William Kelley (May 1875 – death date unknown), nicknamed "King", was an American Negro league outfielder in 1900.

A native of Pennsylvania, Kelley played for the Cuban Giants in 1900. In his two recorded games, he went hitless with a walk in nine plate appearances.

References

External links
 and Seamheads

1875 births
Date of birth missing
Year of death missing
Place of birth missing
Place of death missing
Cuban Giants players
Baseball outfielders
Baseball players from Pennsylvania